Carona is a comune (municipality) in the Province of Bergamo in the Italian region of Lombardy, located about  northeast of Milan and about  north of Bergamo. By the statute of Carona, on its territory there are no hamlets, but it still recognises the localities of Carona Bassa and Pagliari.

Carona borders the following municipalities: Branzi, Caiolo, Foppolo, Gandellino, Piateda, Valbondione, Valgoglio, Valleve.

References